A physical quantity is a physical property of a material or system that can be quantified by measurement. A physical quantity can be expressed as a value, which is the algebraic multiplication of a ' Numerical value ' and a ' Unit '. For example, the physical quantity of mass can be quantified as '32.3 kg ', where '32.3' is the numerical value and 'kg' is the Unit. 
 
A physical quantity possesses at least two characteristics in common. 
 
 Numerical magnitude
 Units

Symbols and nomenclature 

International recommendations for the use of symbols for quantities are set out in ISO/IEC 80000, the IUPAP red book and the IUPAC green book. For example, the recommended symbol for the physical quantity mass is m, and the recommended symbol for the quantity electric charge is Q.

Subscripts and indices 
Subscripts are used for two reasons, to simply attach a name to the quantity or associate it with another quantity, or index a specific component (e.g., row or column).
Name reference: The quantity has a subscripted or superscripted single letter, group of letters, or complete word, to label what concept or entity they refer to, often to distinguish it from other quantities with the same main symbol. These subscripts or superscripts tend to be written in upright roman typeface rather than italics while the main symbol representing the quantity is in italics. For instance, Ek or Ekinetic is usually used to denote kinetic energy and E p or E potential is usually used to denote potential energy.
Quantity reference: The quantity has a subscripted or superscripted single letter, group of letters, or complete word, to parameterize what measurement/s they refer to. These subscripts or superscripts tend to be written in italic rather than in upright roman typeface; the main symbol representing the quantity is in italics. For example cp or cpressure is heat capacity at the pressure given by the quantity in the subscript.

The type of subscript is expressed by its typeface:  'k' and 'p' are abbreviations of the words kinetic and potential, whereas p (italic) is the symbol for the physical quantity pressure rather than an abbreviation of the word.

Indices: The use of indices is for mathematical formulation using index notation.

Size 
Physical quantities can have different "sizes", such as a scalar, a vector, or a tensor.

Scalars 
A scalar is a physical quantity that has magnitude but no direction. Symbols for physical quantities are usually chosen to be a single letter of the Latin or Greek alphabet, and are printed in italic type.

Vectors 
Vectors are physical quantities that possess both magnitude and direction and whose operations obey the axioms of a vector space. Symbols for physical quantities that are vectors are in bold type, underlined or with an arrow above.

Tensors 
Scalars and vectors are the simplest tensors, which can be used to describe more general physical quantities. For example, the Cauchy stress tensor possesses magnitude, direction, and orientation qualities.

Numbers and elementary functions 
Numerical quantities, even those denoted by letters, are usually printed in roman (upright) type, though sometimes in italics. Symbols for elementary functions (circular trigonometric, hyperbolic, logarithmic etc.), changes in a quantity like Δ in Δy or operators like d in dx, are also recommended to be printed in roman type.

Examples:
e, the base of natural logarithms,
i, the imaginary unit,
π for the ratio of a circle's circumference to its diameter, 3.14159265358979323846264338327950288...
δx, Δy, dz, representing differences (finite or otherwise) in the quantities x, y and z
sin α, sinh γ, log x 1 russ street

Units and dimensions

Units
 There is often a choice of unit, though SI units (including submultiples and multiples of the basic unit) are usually used in scientific contexts due to their ease of use, international familiarity and prescription. For example, a quantity of mass might be represented by the symbol m, and could be expressed in the units kilograms (kg), pounds (lb), or daltons (Da).

Dimensions

The notion of dimension of a physical quantity was introduced by Joseph Fourier in 1822. By convention, physical quantities are organized in a dimensional system built upon base quantities, each of which is regarded as having its own dimension.

Base quantities

Base quantities are those quantities that are distinct in nature and in some cases have historically not been defined in terms of other quantities. Base quantities are those quantities on the basis of which other quantities can be expressed. The seven base quantities of the International System of Quantities (ISQ) and their corresponding SI units and dimensions are listed in the following table. Other conventions may have a different number of base units (e.g. the CGS and MKS systems of units).

The last two angular units, plane angle and solid angle, are subsidiary units used in the SI, but are treated as dimensionless. The subsidiary units are used for convenience to differentiate between a truly dimensionless quantity (pure number) and an angle, which are different measurements.

General derived quantities
Derived quantities are those whose definitions are based on other physical quantities (base quantities).

Space
Important applied base units for space and time are below. Area and volume are thus, of course, derived from the length, but included for completeness as they occur frequently in many derived quantities, in particular densities.

Densities, flows, gradients, and moments
Important and convenient derived quantities such as densities, fluxes, flows, currents are associated with many quantities. Sometimes different terms such as current density and flux density, rate, frequency and current, are used interchangeably in the same context, sometimes they are used uniquely.

To clarify these effective template-derived quantities, we let q be any quantity within some scope of context (not necessarily base quantities) and present in the table below some of the most commonly used symbols where applicable, their definitions, usage, SI units and SI dimensions – where [q] denotes the dimension of q.

For time derivatives, specific, molar, and flux densities of quantities, there is no one symbol, nomenclature depends on the subject, though time derivatives can be generally written using overdot notation. For generality we use qm, qn, and F respectively. No symbol is necessarily required for the gradient of a scalar field, since only the nabla/del operator ∇ or grad needs to be written. For spatial density, current, current density and flux, the notations are common from one context to another, differing only by a change in subscripts.

For current density,  is a unit vector in the direction of flow, i.e. tangent to a flowline. Notice the dot product with the unit normal for a surface, since the amount of current passing through the surface is reduced when the current is not normal to the area. Only the current passing perpendicular to the surface contributes to the current passing through the surface, no current passes in the (tangential) plane of the surface.

The calculus notations below can be used synonymously.

If X is a n-variable function , then

The meaning of the term physical quantity is generally well understood (everyone understands what is meant by the frequency of a periodic phenomenon, or the resistance of an electric wire). The term physical quantity does not imply a physically invariant quantity. Length for example is a physical quantity, yet it is variant under coordinate change in special and general relativity. The notion of physical quantities is so basic and intuitive in the realm of science, that it does not need to be explicitly spelled out or even mentioned. It is universally understood that scientists will (more often than not) deal with quantitative data, as opposed to qualitative data. Explicit mention and discussion of physical quantities is not part of any standard science program, and is more suited for a philosophy of science or philosophy program.
 
The notion of physical quantities is seldom used in physics, nor is it part of the standard physics vernacular. The idea is often misleading, as its name implies "a quantity that can be physically measured", yet is often incorrectly used to mean a physical invariant. Due to the rich complexity of physics, many different fields possess different physical invariants. There is no known physical invariant sacred in all possible fields of physics. Energy, space, momentum, torque, position, and length (just to name a few) are all found to be experimentally variant in some particular scale and system. Additionally, the notion that it is possible to measure "physical quantities" comes into question, particularly in quantum field theory and normalization techniques. As infinities are produced by the theory, the actual "measurements" made are not really those of the physical universe (as we cannot measure infinities), they are those of the renormalization scheme which is expressly dependent on our measurement scheme, coordinate system and metric system.

See also
List of physical quantities
List of photometric quantities
List of radiometric quantities
Philosophy of science
Quantity
Observable quantity
Specific quantity

References

Computer implementations
 DEVLIB project in C# Language and Delphi Language
 Physical Quantities project in C# Language at Code Plex
 Physical Measure C# library project in C# Language at Code Plex
 Ethical Measures project in C# Language at Code Plex
 Engineer JS online calculation and scripting tool supporting physical quantities.

Sources
 Cook, Alan H. The observational foundations of physics, Cambridge, 1994. 
 Essential Principles of Physics, P.M. Whelan, M.J. Hodgson, 2nd Edition, 1978, John Murray, 
 Encyclopedia of Physics, R.G. Lerner, G.L. Trigg, 2nd Edition, VHC Publishers, Hans Warlimont, Springer, 2005, pp 12–13
 Physics for Scientists and Engineers: With Modern Physics (6th Edition), P.A. Tipler, G. Mosca, W.H. Freeman and Co, 2008, 9-781429-202657